The 2018 PBA Tour season, the 59th season of play of the U.S. Professional Bowlers Association's (PBA) ten-pin bowling tour, began on January 26, 2018. The season included 21 singles title events, two doubles title events, and a non-title team event (PBA League). The 2018 season was used to mark the PBA's 60th year of operations, which included a 148-player PBA 60th Anniversary Classic in Indianapolis, and the unveiling of the Tour's top 60 moments.

Tournament schedule

The PBA Tournament of Champions and the PBA Players Championship majors were held in February.  The season's third major, the USBC Masters, took place in April, while the U.S. Open was contested in late October. The PBA Tour Finals, first contested in 2017, returned for 2018, featuring the top eight money leaders from the start of 2016 through the 2018 Maine Shootout (April 18). It was held in Allen Park, MI on May 4-6.

On March 21, 2018, Fox Sports announced that it had acquired the television rights for the PBA Tour, replacing ESPN, with 26 broadcasts on Fox Sports 1 and four on Fox beginning in 2019. Fox aired an additional PBA Clash event on December 23, 2018, which served as Fox's debut bowling broadcast and as a prelude for the 2019 season. This broadcast drew a live TV audience of 1.768 million viewers, the highest audience for a bowling broadcast on any network since 2005.

Due to the new agreement, the World Series of Bowling and PBA World Championship were postponed from the 2018 season and moved to March 2019, in order to have them be part of Fox's 2019 schedule. They were replaced on the schedule with a reinstated PBA Fall Swing, held in the Tulsa suburb of Owasso, Oklahoma. This event consisted of two standalone title events (Wolf Open and Bear Open), with these events serving as initial qualifying for the PBA Tulsa Open.

Season awards
The PBA announced its 2018 season awards on November 20.

 Chris Schenkel PBA Player of the Year: Andrew Anderson
 Harry Golden PBA Rookie of the Year: Kamron Doyle
 Steve Nagy Sportsmanship Award: Tom Smallwood
 Tony Reyes Community Service Award: Chris Barnes

Tournament summary
Major tournaments are in bold. Career PBA title numbers for winners are shown in parenthesis (#). 

In late 2017, the PBA released a list of 16 oil patterns that would debut with the 2017 PBA World Series of Bowling and continue into 2018. The patterns now include both a name and number, with the number representing the oil length (in feet). There are nine "Animal" oil patterns: Cheetah 33, Wolf 33, Viper 36, Chameleon 39, Bear 39, Scorpion 42, Shark 45, Dragon 45, and Badger 52. (The Badger 52 pattern will not be used in 2018.) There are also seven "Legends" patterns: Johnny Petraglia 36, Don Carter 39, Don Johnson 40, Earl Anthony 42, Mark Roth 42, Carmen Salvino 44, and Dick Weber 45. 

C: broadcast on CBS Sports Network
E: broadcast on ESPN
F: broadcast on Fox
X: broadcast on the PBA's Xtra Frame webcast service
NQ: World Bowling Tour rules on handicapping allowed female competitors eight handicap pins per game.  As a result, she did not qualify for a PBA or WBT title.  A subsequent rule change has since eliminated the handicapping rule.

References

External links
PBA 2018 Season Schedule
PBA 2018 ESPN TV Schedule

Professional Bowlers Association seasons
2018 in bowling